Bishanin is a Syrian village located in the Awj Subdistrict in Masyaf District. According to the Syria Central Bureau of Statistics (CBS), Bishanin had a population of 1,971 in the 2004 census.

References 

Populated places in Masyaf District